The 1986–87 Irish Cup was the 107th edition of Northern Ireland's premier football knock-out cup competition. It concluded on 2 May 1987 with the final.

Glentoran were the defending champions after winning their 12th Irish Cup last season, defeating Coleraine 2–1 in the 1986 final. They successfully defended the cup for the second year running, by beating Larne 1–0 in the final. In doing so, they became the first club in 94 years to win three consecutive Irish Cups. Linfield were the last club to achieve it, winning the 1891, 1892 and 1893 finals.

This season also saw the number of clubs involved in the competition reduced back to 16 due to the re-structuring of the league system. Only two clubs from outside the 14-club top flight took part, qualifying through preliminary rounds. Omagh Town and Tobermore United qualified to take part in the competition proper, but both clubs went out in the first round.

Results

First round

|}

Replays

|}

Quarter-finals

|}

Replay

|}

Semi-finals

|}

Replay

|}

Final

References

1986–87
1986–87 domestic association football cups
Cup